Ghafoor Butt (5 June 1936 – 23 April 2011) was a Pakistani cricketer and umpire. He stood in one ODI game in 1982.

See also
 List of One Day International cricket umpires

References

External links

1936 births
2011 deaths
Pakistani One Day International cricket umpires
Cricketers from Lahore
Pakistani cricketers
Pakistan Railways cricketers
North Zone (Pakistan) cricketers
Pakistan Eaglets cricketers
Central Zone (Pakistan) cricketers